Joachim Standfest (born 30 May 1980) is an Austrian football coach and a former player who played as a midfielder / defender. He is the manager of the Under-18 team of Austria Wien.

Club career
Born in Leoben, Styria, Standfest made his professional debut for Grazer AK in the 1998–1999 season. He stayed 9 seasons with GAK, winning a league title and three domestic cups. He left GAK for giants Austria Wien in January 2007, just before GAK were demoted to the Regionalliga Mitte because of financial difficulties.

In 2001 Standfest underwent bowel surgery and a tumor was taken away.

In 2010, Standfest transferred from vice-champions Austria Wien to cup-winners Sturm Graz, citing family reasons for the move. In 2012, he left Sturm Graz to join Kapfenberger SV.

International career
He made his debut for Austria in October 2003 against the Czech Republic and was a participant at EURO 2008. Until 21 August, he earned 32 caps, scoring 2 goals.

Coaching career
On 7 August 2020, he was hired by Austrian Football Second League club Amstetten.

On 1 February 2022, Standfest signed with Austria Wien as the head coach of the club's Under-18 squad.

National team statistics

Honours
Austrian Football Bundesliga (1):
 2004
Austrian Cup (5):
 2000, 2002, 2004, 2007, 2009

References

External links
 Profile – FK Austria
 Player profile – EURO2008
 Player profile – Austria Archive
 

1980 births
Living people
People from Leoben
Austrian footballers
Association football midfielders
Association football defenders
Austria international footballers
Austria under-21 international footballers
UEFA Euro 2008 players
Grazer AK players
FK Austria Wien players
SK Sturm Graz players
Kapfenberger SV players
Wolfsberger AC players
Austrian Football Bundesliga players
Austrian football managers
Footballers from Styria